A Classic Education is an alternative pop band from Italy.

Discography

Call It Blazing (2011 - Lefse Records)
Hey There Stranger EP (2010 - Lefse Records)
First EP (2008, self-produced)

References

External links
 

Italian musical groups
Musical groups established in 2007